This is a list of Spanish mountains with their elevation taken from the Instituto Nacional de Estadística de España data.
Where available is also reported the mountains' prominence.

See also
List of mountains in Aragon
List of mountains in Catalonia
List of mountains in the Valencian Community
List of mountains of La Gomera

References

External links

Mountains of Spain